Cupidesthes thyrsis is a butterfly in the family Lycaenidae. It is found in Equatorial Guinea (Bioko), Gabon, the Republic of the Congo and the Democratic Republic of the Congo (Ubangi, Uele, Tshopo, Equateur, Kinshasa, Sankuru and Lualaba).

References

Butterflies described in 1878
Lycaenesthini
Butterflies of Africa
Taxa named by William Forsell Kirby